Felipe Marques da Silva (27 de Janeiro 1990) Atualmente, joga pelo São Bernardo, emprestado pelo Cuiabá.

Career statistics

Honours
Horizonte
Copa Fares Lopes: 2010

Sampaio Corrêa
Campeonato Maranhense: 2017

Remo
Campeonato Paraense: 2018

Cuiabá
Copa Verde: 2019

References

External links
 

1990 births
Living people
Sportspeople from Ceará
Brazilian footballers
Association football forwards
Campeonato Brasileiro Série A players
Campeonato Brasileiro Série B players
Campeonato Brasileiro Série C players
Horizonte Futebol Clube players
Sampaio Corrêa Futebol Clube players
Clube do Remo players
Londrina Esporte Clube players
Grêmio Novorizontino players
Cuiabá Esporte Clube players
Associação Ferroviária de Esportes players